Japan has the second-biggest music industry in the world, although 80 percent of sales are attributed to physical formats. Due to the numerous record companies present in Japan, launching music streaming services has grown difficult, with YouTube being one of the only prominent streaming services for Japanese music, within and outside the country. Most of the appeal of "homegrown pop idols" restricts access to most Japanese music to the domestic market.

This is a list of J-pop (Japanese pop, rock, etc.) concerts and live appearances held outside of Asia.

1979–1980

1998–2004

2005–2009

2010

2011

2012

2013

2014

2015

2016

2017

2018

2019

2020

2021

2022

2023

Notes

Recurring

See also 

 J-pop
 Japanese rock
 List of musical artists from Japan
 Vocaloid concerts: Miku Expo
 List of K-pop concerts held outside Asia

References

list
Lists of concerts and performances by location